Acathartus is a genus of beetles in the family Silvanidae, containing the following species:

 Acathartus insignis (Grouvelle, 1895)
 Acathartus mizoramensis Pal & Halstead, 1998

References

Silvanidae genera